Henriciella litoralis is a Gram-negative, strictly aerobic and non-spore-formin bacterium from the genus of Henriciella which has been isolated from tidal flat from the Yellow Sea.

References 

Caulobacterales
Bacteria described in 2011